Arthur Morris (1882–1945) was an English professional footballer who played in the Football League for Birmingham. He played as an inside left.

Morris was born in Market Drayton, Shropshire. He played for Shrewsbury Town before joining Birmingham in 1906. Morris made his debut in the First Division on 2 March 1907, scoring a goal which secured a 1–1 draw at home to Manchester United, and played in the next game, but then lost his place to Frank Cornan. A creative player, he appeared once more in the 1906–07 season, when Cornan moved to left half to cover for the absent Jim Dougherty, and again scored to gain Birmingham a point. After appearing only once in the following season, he returned to Shrewsbury Town in 1908.

Morris died in Shrewsbury, Shropshire, in 1945.

References

1882 births
1945 deaths
People from Market Drayton
English footballers
Association football midfielders
Shrewsbury Town F.C. players
Birmingham City F.C. players
English Football League players
Date of birth missing
Date of death missing